The 2009 Akron Zips men's soccer team represented the University of Akron during the 2009 NCAA Division I men's soccer season. The Zips finished the season undefeated and won every match of the season except for the national championship game, where they lost in penalties to Virginia.

Roster

Schedule 

|-
!colspan=6 style=""| Preseason
|-

|-
!colspan=6 style=""| Regular season
|-

|-
!colspan=6 style=""| MAC Tournament
|-

|-
!colspan=6 style=""| NCAA Tournament
|-

References

External links 
2009 Akron Men's Soccer Statistics

Akron Zips
Akron Zips men's soccer seasons
Akron
Akron
Akron Zips
NCAA Division I Men's Soccer Tournament College Cup seasons